The 1987 James Madison Dukes football team was an American football team that represented James Madison University during the 1987 NCAA Division I-AA football season as an independent. In their third year under head coach Joe Purzycki, the team compiled a 9–3 record.

Schedule

References

James Madison
James Madison Dukes football seasons
James Madison Dukes football